Year 1512 (MDXII) was a leap year starting on Thursday (link will display the full calendar) of the Julian calendar.

Events 
 January–June 
 Mid-January – Following the death of Svante Nilsson, Eric Trolle is elected the new Regent of Sweden. He is, however, ousted after only six months in favour of Sten Sture the Younger.
 February 18 – War of the League of Cambrai: The French carry out the Sack of Brescia.
 April 11 – War of the League of Cambrai – Battle of Ravenna:  French under Gaston of Foix, Duke of Nemours, defeat the Spanish under Raymond of Cardona, but Gaston is killed in the pursuit.
 May 3 – The Fifth Council of the Lateran begins.
 May 12 – Thomas Howard, 2nd Duke of Norfolk, leads an English expedition into France and burns the port city of Brest.
 May 26 – Selim I succeeds Bayezid II, as Sultan of the Ottoman Empire.

 July–December 
 July 23 – Sten Sture the Younger is elected new Regent of Sweden, deposing Eric Trolle.
 August 10 – War of the League of Cambrai – Battle of Saint-Mathieu: The English navy defeats the French-Breton fleet. Both navies use ships firing cannons through ports, and each loses its principal ship — Regent and Marie-la-Cordelière — through a large explosion aboard the latter.
 Summer – War of the League of Cambrai: Ferdinand II of Aragon sends Don Fadrique de Toledo, to complete the Spanish conquest of Iberian Navarre.
 October 19 – Martin Luther becomes a doctor of theology (Doctor in Biblia).
 October 21 – Martin Luther joins the theological faculty of the University of Wittenberg.
 November 1 – The ceiling of the Sistine Chapel, painted by Michelangelo Buonarroti, is exhibited to the public for the first time.
 December 27 – The Spanish Crown issues the Laws of Burgos, governing the conduct of settlers with regard to native Indians in the New World.

 Date unknown 
 António de Abreu discovers Timor Island, and reaches the Banda Islands, Ambon Island and Seram.
 Francisco Serrão reaches the Moluccas.
 Francisco Serrao and other shipwreck sailors with permission from the Ternate Sultanate build Fort Tolukko. It is one of the earliest, if not the first European style fortress in southeast Asia.
 Juan Ponce de León discovers the Turks and Caicos Islands.
 Pedro Mascarenhas discovers Diego Garcia, and reaches Mauritius in the Mascarene Islands.
 Moldavia becomes a vassal of the Ottoman Empire, on the same conditions as Wallachia: the voivode will be designated by the Turks, but will be Eastern Orthodox Christians. Also, the Turks are not allowed to build mosques, to be buried, to own land or to settle in the country.
 The Florentine Republic begins to be dismantled, and the Medici Family comes back into power.
 The word masque is first used to denote a poetic drama.
 Possible date – Nicolaus Copernicus begins to write Commentariolus, an abstract of what will eventually become his heliocentric astronomy De revolutionibus orbium coelestium; he sends it to other scientists interested in the matter by 1514.

Births 

 January 13 – Gaspar de Quiroga y Vela, General Inquisitor of Spain (d. 1594)
 January 17 – Sibylle of Cleves, electress consort of Saxony (d. 1554)
 January 31 – Henry, King of Portugal and Cardinal (d. 1580)
 February 3 – John Hamilton, archbishop of St Andrews (d. 1571)
 February 22 – Pedro Agustín, Spanish Catholic bishop (d. 1572)
 March 5 – Gerardus Mercator, Flemish cartographer (d. 1594)
 April 10 – James V of Scotland, King of Scots (d. 1542)
 April 23 – Henry FitzAlan, 19th Earl of Arundel, Chancellor of the University of Oxford (d. 1580)
 April 30 – George II, Duke of Münsterberg-Oels, Count of Glatz (d. 1553)
 July 5 – Cristoforo Madruzzo, Italian Catholic cardinal (d. 1578)
 July 25 – Diego de Covarubias y Leyva, Spanish jurist, Roman Catholic prelate, Archbishop of Cuenca (d. 1577)
 August ? – Catherine Parr, English queen consort (d. 1548)
 August 27 – Friedrich Staphylus, German theologian (d. 1564)
 November 4 – Hu Zongxian, Chinese general (d. 1565)
 November 9 – Jon Simonssøn, Norwegian humanist (d. 1575)
 November 11 – Marcin Kromer, Prince-Bishop of Warmia (d. 1589)
 December 21 – Boniface IV, Marquess of Montferrat, Italian nobleman (d. 1530)
 date unknown
 Robert Recorde, Welsh physician and mathematician (d. 1558)
 Gissur Einarsson, first Lutheran bishop in Iceland (d. 1548)

Deaths 

 January 2 – Svante Nilsson, regent of Sweden since 1504 (b. 1460)
 January 30 – Reinhard IV, Count of Hanau-Münzenberg (1500–1512) (b. 1473)
 February 2 – Hatuey, Puerto Rican Taíno chief
 February 22 – Amerigo Vespucci, Italian merchant and cartographer, after whom the Americas are named (b. 1451)
 March 29 – Lucas Watzenrode, Prince-Bishop of Warmia (b. 1447)
 April 11 
 Gaston de Foix, French military commander (b. 1489)
 Asakura Sadakage, 9th head of the Asakura clan (b. 1473)
 May 21 – Pandolfo Petrucci, ruler of Siena (b. 1452)
 May 26 – Bayezid II, Ottoman Sultan (b. 1447)
 June 20 – Goto Yujo, Japanese swordsman and artisan (b. 1440)
 August 2 – Alessandro Achillini, Italian philosopher (b. 1463)
 August 15 – Imperia Cognati, Italian courtesan (b. 1486)
 September 15 – John Stewart, 1st Earl of Atholl, Scottish peer (b. 1440)
 September 29 – Johannes Engel, German doctor, astronomer and astrologer (b. 1453)
 October 5 – Sophia Jagiellon, Margravine of Brandenburg-Ansbach, Polish princess (b. 1464)
 October 31 – Anna of Saxony, Electress of Brandenburg (b. 1437)

References